The 1979 Liège–Bastogne–Liège was the 65th edition of the Liège–Bastogne–Liège cycle race and was held on 22 April 1979. The race started and finished in Liège. The race was won by Dietrich Thurau of the IJsboerke team.

General classification

References

1979
1979 in Belgian sport
April 1979 sports events in Europe
1979 Super Prestige Pernod